Sajama Cut is a band from Jakarta, Indonesia. It currently consists of lead vocalist Marcel Thee, keyboardist Hans Citra Patria, lead guitarist Dion Panlima Reza, drummer Banu Satrio, and bassist Arta Kurnia. The band is well known for their changing styles of music, which ranges from noise pop, ambient, indie rock, baroque pop, folk rock, lo-fi, to electronica.

History
The band is known to have come up with numerous explanations for their name, among them; the name of an old Japanese children's toy, the name of Thee's father's colleague, a book/movie title, a haircut style, a random word Thee came up with, the result of the band members fooling around with an Ouija Board. This has been discredited by Marcel Thee.

In 2006, Sajama Cut also contributed 4 songs to another motion picture Photo, Box, Window.

In May 2008, L'Internationale; a remix album version of the songs from The Osaka Journals with remixes from international producers from Japan, US, UK, Indonesia, Norway, Italy, Scotland, Portugal, Germany, Venezuella and Hong Kong was released. The first single being a remix of Nemesis/Murder from the international 8-bit artist YMCK, from Tokyo, Japan. Currently there are 3 music videos made for singles from this album.

Two EPs; Night Music (1923) and Cinema Eye was released in late 2008. Another EP, New Year Ends, which dabbled in ambient, experimental music, was released during the New Year's Eve of 2010.

Sajama Cut released their new album, Manimal, in April 2010. In 2015, they released their fourth full album Hobgoblin.

Sajama Cut released their fifth full album, Godsigma (stylized as GODSIGMA), on 16 October 2020.

The Osaka Journals was listed in the "Top 5 Albums of 2000s" in The Jakarta Post newspaper.

Discography
The band has released five albums, along with numerous compilations, most notably the best selling JKT:SKRG (Jakarta Now!) compilation, and had a major radio hit when their single "Less Afraid" appeared on the motion picture Joni's Promise, in which the song could be heard almost in its entirety two times during the movie.

Albums

Singles/Remixes/EPs

Compilations

See also
 List of Indonesian rock bands

References

External links
 
 Beat Magazine The Osaka Journals review 
 Interview and sample of Nemesis/Murder YMCK remix
 Weekender interview
 Deep Sonar interview
 The Jakarta Post review
 The Jakarta Post article

Indonesian rock music groups